Oh, This Old Thing? is the debut album by Twin Cities-based band Sleeping in the Aviary, released on February 6, 2007 on Science of Sound Records.

Critical reception

Tom Laskin of Isthmus described "Another Girl" as "...the kind of crazed, effervescent bass-drum-guitar confection that banishes the cares of a crappy day to the small, dark room where they belong."

Track listing

References

2007 debut albums
Sleeping in the Aviary albums